Xuxa só para Baixinhos 8 - Escola (also known as XSPB 8) is the thirty-first studio album and the twenty-fourth in Portuguese by singer and Brazilian presenter Xuxa, released by Som Livre on September 13, 2008. It is the eighth album in the collection Só Para Baixinhos.

Release and reception
Xuxa só para Baixinhos 8 - Escola was released on September 13, 2008. The album sold more than 371,000 copies, ranking 7th on the list of best-selling DVDs in Brazil in 2008. The album received platinum certification by Associação Brasileira de Produtores de Discos (ABPD). The singles were "XSPB no ar", "Tumbalacatumba" and "Olha a Música". This was the last album of the collection "Só Para Baixinhos" released by the record company Som Livre, before Xuxa signed contract with the record company Sony Music. At the end of 2014, XSPBs 6, 7 and 8 were released on Blu-ray by Som Livre.

Track listing

Personnel
Art Direction: Xuxa Meneghel
Direction: Paulo de Barros
Production: Luiz Cláudio Moreira e Mônica Muniz
Production Director: Junior Porto
Musical production: Ary Sperling
Cover and Ente: Felipe Gois
Cinematography: André Horta
Set design: Lueli Antunes

Certifications

References

External links 
 Xuxa só para Baixinhos 8 at Discogs

2008 albums
2008 video albums
Xuxa albums
Xuxa video albums
Children's music albums by Brazilian artists
Portuguese-language video albums
Portuguese-language albums
Som Livre albums